Clear Fork High School is located near Bellville, Ohio, United States. The school serves grades 9–12 and is part of the Clear Fork Valley Local School District. Clear Fork is a member of the Mid-Ohio Athletic Conference.

Academics
In 2005, Clear Fork High School was reviewed against the Ohio Department of Education's new standards (involving the OGT or Ohio Graduation Test) and found to be highly ranked in all areas examined with higher than 80% in all of them.

Athletics

Ohio High School Athletic Association State Championships

 Boys' basketball – 2002
 Boys' baseball – 2010

Notes and references

External links
School website

Educational institutions established in 1961
High schools in Richland County, Ohio
Public high schools in Ohio
1961 establishments in Ohio